This is the complete list of Olympic medalists in ski jumping.

Men

Normal hill individual

Large hill individual 
The individual large hill event is one of only ten events which have featured in every Winter Olympic Games.

Large hill team

Women

Normal hill individual

Mixed

Normal hill team

Statistics

Athlete medal leaders (men) 
Four or more Olympic medals in ski jumping:

Most individual medals (athletes with at least one gold medal or at least two medals including at least one silver medal):

Athlete medal leaders (women) 
Most individual medals (athletes with at least one gold medal or at least two medals including at least one silver medal).

Medals per year

Medal sweep events
These are events in which athletes from one NOC won all three medals.

See also
 List of FIS Nordic World Ski Championships medalists in ski jumping

References
 International Olympic Committee results database

Ski jumping
Medalists in ski jumping
Olympic medalists in ski jumping